Dave Berg is an American television producer who was co-producer of The Tonight Show with Jay Leno for 18 years.  He was hired as a segment producer for The Tonight Show with Jay Leno before its debut on May 25, 1992.

He was also a consultant to the late Frank Pastore and was a regular guest on Pastore's radio show.  Berg has a bachelor's degree in political science from Northwestern University and a master's degree in journalism from Kansas State University.

In 2014, he wrote the book Behind the Curtain: An Insider's View of Jay Leno's Tonight Show.

References

American television producers
Kansas State University alumni
Northwestern University alumni
Living people
Year of birth missing (living people)